PKS 2014-55 is an X-shaped radio galaxy discovered by the MeerKAT radio telescope in South Africa that is located 800 million light-years away from Earth. The galaxy looks like two boomerangs, with jets extending 2.5 million light years across. Then the jets are “reversed” by the pressure of intergalactic gas, later deflected by gas pressure to form an “X” shape.

References 

Galaxies
Telescopium (constellation)